The 1st Individual European Artistic Gymnastics Championships (European Men's and Women's Artistic Gymnastics Individual Championships) were held in Debrecen, Hungary, on 2 June to 5 June 2005. It included both men's and women's events.

Medal winners

Medal table

Combined

Men

Women

Men's results

Individual all-around

Floor exercise

Pommel horse

Rings

Vault

Parallel bars

Horizontal bar

Women's results

Individual all-around

Vault

Uneven Bars

Balance Beam

Floor Exercise

References 
 
 
 
 
 
 

2005
European Artistic Gymnastics Championships
2005 in European sport
International gymnastics competitions hosted by Hungary
2005 in Hungarian sport